is in Ōta, Tokyo, Japan. It has 506 beds and is run by the Tokyo Metropolitan Health and Hospitals Corporation.

As the hospital is located near Haneda Airport, it often provides treatment to those returning from abroad. It is specially equipped to manage infectious diseases.

History
The hospital was established in July 1898.

During the 2020 coronavirus pandemic, Ebara Hospital took in the first Japanese evacuees from Wuhan, China, who showed symptoms of the disease. The hospital has rooms with negative air pressure ventilation systems designed to prevent the spread of infectious diseases.

Departments

See also
 List of hospitals in Japan

References

External links
 

Hospitals established in 1898
Hospitals in Tokyo